John Magee (September 3, 1794 – April 5, 1868) was an American veteran of the War of 1812 who served two terms as a member of the United States House of Representatives from New York from 1827 to 1831.

Biography
Magee was born in Easton, Northampton County, Pennsylvania, where he attended public schools. He served in the United States Army in the War of 1812; moved to Bath, Steuben County, New York in 1812. He was elected constable in 1818 and served until 1820. He was appointed Sheriff of Steuben County, New York in 1821 and elected to that office in 1822.

Congress 
Magee was elected to the Twentieth Congress and reelected as a Jacksonian to the Twenty-first Congress (March 4, 1827 – March 3, 1831). Magee was nominated again in 1830 but lost to the Anti-Masonic candidate, Grattan H. Wheeler. Magee served as a delegate to the State Constitutional Convention in 1867.  His 1831 home in Bath was the Davenport Free Library from 1893 to 1999, and is a National Register site under the Davenport name.  Currently called the Magee House, it now houses Steuben County Historical Society and the Steuben County Historian's office.

Later career and death 

Magee devoted the remaining years of his life to banking, railroading, and was also interested in mining. Magee died at Watkins, Schuyler County, New York on April 5, 1868 at the age of 73. He is interred in Glenwood Cemetery.

Legacy 
Watkins Glen, New York and Wellsboro, Pennsylvania each have a Magee Street named for John Magee, or for his family. Duncan Township, in Tioga County, Pennsylvania, is named for one of this sons.<ref>Kirk House, "Steuben County People on the Maps of Two Worlds," Steuben Echoes 44:4, November 2018, page 9.''</ref>

References

  Retrieved on 2010-01-02
 A Biography of John Magee by Gary M. Emerson
 John Magee and the Southern Tier Stage Lines by James D. Folts
 Memorial of John Magee''.  Rev. Franklin Shumway Howe (1870).

External links
John Magee at The Political Graveyard

 

1794 births
1868 deaths
19th-century American politicians
Burials in New York (state)
Jacksonian members of the United States House of Representatives from New York (state)
Members of the United States House of Representatives from New York (state)
People from Bath, New York
Politicians from Northampton County, Pennsylvania
Sheriffs of Steuben County, New York
United States Army personnel of the War of 1812